Luitpold Adam (1888–1950) was a German painter

Adam was an official war artist during the First World War; and he was chosen by Adolf Hitler to be the head of the Nazi war artist program in the Second World War.  In 1944, the number of war artists working under him numbered 80.

See also
 War artist
 List of German painters

Notes

References
 Evans, Richard J. (2009).  The Third Reich at War. New York:Penguin Press. , ;  OCLC 233549166
 McCloskey, Barbara. (2005).  Artists of World War II. Westport: Greenwood Press. , ;  OCLC 475496457
 Yenne, William P. German War Art 1939–1945. Greenwich, Connecticut: Bison Books. , ;  OCLC 263540107

1888 births
1950 deaths
20th-century German painters
20th-century German male artists
German male painters
Realist painters
German war artists
World War I artists
World War II artists